Universal Attractions Agency (UAA) is an American talent agency. It was founded by Ben Bart (Benjamin Robert Bart, 1906–1968)  in 1945. The New York City-based agency is currently under the management of Jeff Allen and Jeff Epstein.

The agency’s history includes launching the career of the soul singer James Brown and representing him for more than 40 years.

History

In 1945, agent Ben Bart decided to resign from his position at The Gale Agency. He opened the Universal Attractions Agency that same year.

Notable past artists

Jimmy Lunceford
Hank Ballard and The Midnighters
The "5" Royales
Grateful Dead
James Brown & The Famous Flames
Little Willie John
Joe Tex
Tiny Bradshaw
Cootie Williams
Arnett Cobb
Dinah Washington
Chuck Berry
Charles Aznavour
The Ravens

Notable past agents

Dick Allen 
Joe Marsolais
Dick Boone
Jack Fink
Harry Lineshetska
James Crawford
Deloris Rosayler
Marti Otelsburg
Lewis (Chet) Dillon
Tammy Taylor 
Larry Myers

Notable present artists
Angie Stone
MC Hammer
The Stylistics
The Chi-Lites
The O'Jays
Roy Ayers
Jennifer Holliday
Najee
Pieces of a Dream
Jimmy "JJ" Walker
DMX
Bobby Brown
KRS-One
Salt-N-Pepa
Keith Sweat
Johnny Gill
Phil Perry
Tevin Campbell 
Slick Rick
Bell Biv DeVoe
Heavy D
Mos Def
The Sugarhill Gang
SWV
Too Short
CeCe Winans
Donald Lawrence
Mary Mary
The Delfonics
The Dramatics
Walter Beasley
En Vogue
J Anthony Brown
After 7
Angela Winbush
Chaka Khan
Howard Hewett

References

External links
 Universal Attractions website

Talent agencies
Companies based in New York City
American companies established in 1949
Mass media companies established in 1949
1949 establishments in New York City